Dae Won-ui (died 793) (r. 793) was the 4th ruler of the kingdom of Balhae.

Background 
Dae Won-ui was a son of King Mu, the second ruler of Balhae, and the brother of the previous king, King Mun; when Mun's son Dae Goeng-rim died, Won-ui was chosen as the next king.

Reign and death
However, upon ascending the throne the king showed a jealous and violent temper. In 793, he was slain by his ministers. The son of Goeng-rim was chosen to replace him, becoming King Seong.

See also
List of Korean monarchs
History of Korea

References

Balhae rulers
Mohe peoples
793 deaths
8th-century rulers in Asia
Year of birth unknown
Dethroned monarchs